Chahhyaben Bhuva is a Bharatiya Janata Party politician. He was counsellor at Surat Municipal Corporation and between 2010 and 2012 Deputy Mayor of Surat, India.

References

Living people
People from Surat
Ahmedabad municipal councillors
Bharatiya Janata Party politicians from Gujarat
Year of birth missing (living people)